Sheldon Allman (June 8, 1924 – January 22, 2002) was an American-Canadian actor, singer, and songwriter.

Early life and career
Allman was born in Chicago, Illinois. He began his singing career with the Royal National Guard during his World War II service with the Royal Canadian Air Force. He moved to Los Angeles in 1949, in order to attend the Los Angeles Conservatory of Music. After it, he appeared in 12 films, including such notable films as Nevada Smith, The Sons of Katie Elder, Hud and In Cold Blood. His co-stars included, respectively, Steve McQueen, John Wayne and Paul Newman. He also made appearances in numerous TV series during the 1960s and 1970s.

On television, Allman provided the voice of Big H in CB Bears on CBS and played Norm Miller in Harris Against the World on NBC. He provided music on the game show Three for the Money on NBC, and he was the singing voice for TV's Mister Ed, for which he also wrote and recorded "The Pretty Little Filly with the Ponytail" and "The Empty Feedbag Blues". Mr. Allman wrote longer versions of these songs, but never recorded the longer versions. He was the lyricist for the theme song to George of the Jungle. Additionally, Allman worked with Stan Worth, co-writer of the "George of the Jungle" theme, to create music for a number of game shows by Stefan Hatos-Monty Hall Productions, including the 1970s versions of Let's Make a Deal, Masquerade Party and It Pays to be Ignorant.

In 1960, Allman released Folk Songs for the 21st Century, an album of novelty songs all revolving around science-fiction themes. The tongue-in-cheek material, which Allman wrote and arranged himself, included titles such as "Crawl Out Through The Fallout" and "Radioactive Mama." "Crawl Out Through The Fallout" is used in the video game Fallout 4.

In addition, Allman co-wrote two comedy horror-themed stage musicals with Bobby Pickett, composer of the hit novelty song, "Monster Mash."  The musicals were I'm Sorry the Bridge Is Out, You'll Have to Spend the Night and its sequel, Frankenstein Unbound, the former of which was made into the 1995 film, Monster Mash.

Death
On January 22, 2002, Allman died of heart failure at his home in Culver City, California, at age 77. His interment is in Culver City's Hillside Memorial Park Cemetery.

Filmography

References

External links

1924 births
2002 deaths
American male film actors
American male television actors
Jewish American musicians
American male singer-songwriters
Singers from Chicago
People from Culver City, California
Male actors from Chicago
Royal Canadian Air Force personnel of World War II
Canadian male film actors
Canadian male television actors
20th-century American male actors
20th-century Canadian male actors
20th-century Canadian male singers
Burials at Hillside Memorial Park Cemetery
Singer-songwriters from California
20th-century American male singers
20th-century American singers
American emigrants to Canada
20th-century American Jews
21st-century American Jews
Singer-songwriters from Illinois